Verve Energy was a Western Australian Government owned corporation responsible for operating the state's electricity generators on the state's South West Interconnected System (SWIS). It was split from the then vertically integrated Western Power Corporation, in 2006 during reforms to the state's electricity sector.

The company was merged into Synergy in 2014.

Generators
Verve Energy owned five major power stations, supplying electricity to the South West Interconnected System:

 Muja Power Station, east of Collie
 Collie Power Station, in Collie
 Kwinana Power Station, in Naval Base heavy industrial suburb
 Cockburn Power Station, in Cockburn
 Pinjar Power Station, in Pinjar
 Mungarra Power Station

In addition it owned various other generation plants, including the Albany Wind Farm, wind diesel, and biomass facilities.

See also
 State Energy Commission of Western Australia
 Western Power
 Alinta

References

External links
 
 Government of Western Australia - Office of Energy
 Government of Western Australia - Office of Energy - Electricity Reform Implementation Unit

Companies based in Perth, Western Australia
Energy in Western Australia
Government-owned companies of Western Australia
Energy companies established in 2006
Australian companies established in 2006
Defunct electric power companies of Australia